Alexander Mesa Travieso (born 5 February 1995), commonly known as just Nano, is a Spanish footballer who plays as a forward.

He played 16 games and scored once in La Liga for Eibar, Levante and Cádiz, but spent most of his career in the Segunda División, with 163 games and 26 goals in service of five clubs.

Club career

Tenerife
Nano was born in San Cristóbal de La Laguna, Canary Islands, and joined CD Tenerife's youth setup in 2006 at the age of 11. He made his senior debuts with the reserves in the 2012–13 season, while still a junior, in Tercera División.

On 30 December 2013 Nano was promoted to the main squad in Segunda División. The following 18 January he played his first match as a professional, coming on as a second-half substitute in a 0–4 home loss against AD Alcorcón.

Nano was loaned to CE L'Hospitalet in Segunda División B on 15 August 2014. Just over a year later he was definitely promoted to the Blanquiazules' main squad, signing a new contract until 2018.

Nano scored his first professional goal on 23 August 2015, netting his team's third in a 3–6 away loss against CD Numancia. On 21 February of the following year, he scored a brace in a 3–1 home win against UE Llagostera; he added another seven days later, in a 2–1 success at CD Mirandés.

Nano remained with his goalscoring form later on, scoring a double in a 2–2 draw at Deportivo Alavés in April, and another in a 3–1 home win against Real Valladolid in May. He finished the campaign with 14 goals, being the club's top goalscorer and the eighth overall.

Eibar
On 27 August 2016, SD Eibar reached an agreement with Tenerife for the transfer of Nano, for a fee of €3.25 million. Two days later, he signed a five-year deal with the La Liga club. He made his debut in the category on 20 September, starting and scoring his team's only in a 1–2 loss at Málaga CF.

Nano was loaned to fellow top-tier club Levante UD on 1 September 2017, for one year. The following 31 January, his loan was terminated and he moved to Sporting de Gijón in the second, on loan until the end of the season.

On 4 August 2018, Nano returned to his first club Tenerife on a one-year loan deal.

Cádiz
On 13 August 2019, Nano moved to second division side Cádiz CF also in a temporary deal until the end of the 2019–20 season. 

After achieving promotion, the Andalusians bought half of Nano's federative rights on 14 August 2020, and he signed a permanent four-year contract with the club. On 31 January 2021, he signed on loan with UD Logroñés for the remainder of the 2020–21 season.

On 28 August 2021, Nano moved to Real Zaragoza also in the second division, on loan for one year. The following 20 July, he terminated his contract with Cádiz.

In Kings League
In January 2023, Nano played in Gerard Piqué and Ibai Llanos' seven-a-side Kings League for the xBuyer Team. He appeared in a lucha libre mask with the number 69 and sleeves to cover his tattoos, while going under the pseudonym Enigma. While rumoured to be Isco, the player's identity was revealed by journalist Guillem Balagué.

Career statistics

Club

References

External links
Tenerife official profile 

1995 births
Living people
People from San Cristóbal de La Laguna
Sportspeople from the Province of Santa Cruz de Tenerife
Spanish footballers
Footballers from the Canary Islands
Association football forwards
La Liga players
Segunda División players
Segunda División B players
Tercera División players
CD Tenerife B players
CD Tenerife players
CE L'Hospitalet players
SD Eibar footballers
Levante UD footballers
Sporting de Gijón players
Cádiz CF players
UD Logroñés players
Real Zaragoza players